All Saints Chapel and Morris Family Burial Ground is a historic Episcopal church located at Morris in Otsego County, New York. The church is a small stone Gothic Revival style chapel built from about 1866 to 1868. The rectangular building is three bays wide and four bays deep under a steeply sloping gable roof with slate shingles.  It features a projecting central bell-cote tower and a large rose window.  The first burial in the Morris Family Burial Ground dates to 1791 and it remains an active family burial ground.  Also on the property is a wagon shed dating to the 1860s.

It was listed on the National Register of Historic Places in 1997.

References

External links
 
 

Properties of religious function on the National Register of Historic Places in New York (state)
Cemeteries on the National Register of Historic Places in New York (state)
Gothic Revival church buildings in New York (state)
Churches completed in 1868
19th-century Episcopal church buildings
Churches in Otsego County, New York
Cemeteries in Otsego County, New York
Anglican cemeteries in the United States
1791 establishments in New York (state)
National Register of Historic Places in Otsego County, New York